Kerby may refer to:

Kerby (name)
Kerby, California, a former settlement
Kerby, Oregon, an unincorporated community
Kerby, an unincorporated community in Caledonia Township, Shiawassee County, Michigan
Kerby House, a historic Greek Revival plantation house and historic district in Prairieville, Alabama

See also
Kirby (disambiguation)